Itanong mo kay Soriano, Biblia ang Sasagot! (English: Ask Bro Eli, the Bible Will Answer!) also known as Ang Dating Daan: Bible Exposition is a religious radio and television program in the Philippines produced by the Members Church of God International and hosted by Bro. Eli Soriano. Unlike its sister program, Ang Dating Daan: Bible Study and Mass Indoctrination, the program features a question and answer format in which any visitor in the show can ask Soriano about biblical teachings. In the Philippines, the broadcast of this program takes place right after Ang Dating Daan and it became a separate show in 1993. In the other countries, however, this show is part of the TV program O Caminho Antigo which is also hosted by Soriano. He regularly conducts "Bible Expositions" in specific venues (stadiums, public places, etc.) where the people can ask him personally on biblical issues, the Exposition is then recorded and broadcast as this show.

Status

Currently, Itanong mo kay Soriano airs in 73 countries worldwide including United States and other English-speaking countries (as Ask Bro Eli, the Bible will Answer), Brazil and Portugal (as Pergunte ao Irmão Eli Soriano, A Bíblia Respondera), Spain and Latin América (as Pregúntele al Hermano Eli Soriano, La Biblia Responderá) and also in India, South Africa, Saipan.

Suspension of broadcasting rights 
In 2005, the Movie and Television Review and Classification Board (MTRCB, Philippines) banned Soriano's programs (including this one) because of statements made by Soriano against the Iglesia ni Cristo (INC), and the MTRCB. He was prohibited from uttering libellous and defamatory statements against INC. Soriano had used terms like iglesiang pumapatay ng kapwa tao (church who murders) and iglesia ni Manalo (church of Manalo) to malign the INC in his programs. The Philippine's Commission on Human Rights,  urged Soriano to file charges against the MTRCB. The CHR ruled that Soriano's "freedom of speech and religion" was violated by the MTRCB's suspension order.

Related Shows
Ang Dating Daan: Bible Study
Ang Dating Daan: Mass Indoctrination

Awards

See also
Religion in the Philippines
List of televangelists in Brazil
D'X-Man

References

External links

UNTV Channel 37\]
Ang Dating Daan Official Web Site
MCGI Official Web Site
About MCGI
Bro. Eli Soriano Official Website
Good News Online - The Old Path
TruthCaster 
ADD Community Portal

Philippine religious television series
UNTV (Philippines) original programming
Members Church of God International
1993 Philippine television series debuts
Filipino-language television shows
Pergunte ao Irmão Eli Soriano
Pregúntele al Hermano Eli Soriano